Construction of the first high-speed rail in Germany began shortly after that of the French LGVs (lignes à grande vitesse, high-speed lines). However, legal battles caused significant  delays, so that the German Intercity-Express (ICE) trains were deployed ten years after the TGV network was established.

InterCityExpress

The first regularly scheduled ICE trains ran on 2 June 1991 from Hamburg-Altona via Hamburg Hbf – Hannover Hbf – Kassel-Wilhelmshöhe – Fulda – Frankfurt Hbf – Mannheim Hbf and Stuttgart Hbf toward München Hbf on the new ICE line 6. The ICE network is more tightly integrated with pre-existing lines and trains as a result of the different settlement structure in Germany, which has almost twice the population density of France. ICE trains reached destinations in Austria and Switzerland soon after they entered service, taking advantage of the same voltage used in these countries. Starting in 2000, multisystem third-generation ICE trains entered the Netherlands and Belgium.

Admission of ICE trains onto French LGVs was applied for in 2001, and trial runs completed in 2005. Since June 2007, ICEs service Paris from Frankfurt and Saarbrücken via the LGV Est.

Unlike the Shinkansen in Japan, Germany has experienced a fatal accident on a high-speed service. In the Eschede train disaster of 1998, a first generation ICE experienced catastrophic wheel failure while travelling at  near Eschede, following complaints of excessive vibration. Of 287 passengers aboard, 101 people died and 88 were injured in the resulting derailment, which was made worse by the train colliding with a road bridge and causing it to collapse. The accident was the result of faulty wheel design and, following the crash, all ICE wheels of that design were redesigned and replaced.

International operators

Thalys trains began running in Germany in 1997, from the Belgian HSL 3 to Aachen and Cologne using the Cologne–Aachen high-speed railway. TGV POS trains began running in Germany in 2007, to Karlsruhe and Stuttgart using the Mannheim–Stuttgart and Karlsruhe–Basel high-speed lines. Swiss SBB high-speed services using the New Pendolino from Frankfurt to Milan on the Karlsruhe–Basel line started in 2017.

Transrapid
Germany has developed the Transrapid, a maglev train system. In China, Shanghai Maglev Train, a Transrapid-technology–based maglev built in collaboration with Siemens, Germany, has been operational since March 2004.

List of high-speed lines

Upgraded line
 Cologne–Aachen high-speed railway (upgraded line, 250 km/h)

Partially new line
Part of these routes are new constructions that run along or close to the existing, or previous, route:
 Hanover–Berlin high-speed railway (partially new line, 250 km/h on the new section, 160 and 200 km/h on the existing sections)
 Nuremberg–Erfurt high-speed railway (partially new line, 300 km/h)

Fully new line
Completely new construction projects:
 Cologne–Frankfurt high-speed rail line (new line, 300 km/h)
 Hanover–Würzburg high-speed railway (new line, 280 km/h)
 Mannheim–Stuttgart high-speed railway (new line, 280 km/h)
 Erfurt–Leipzig/Halle high-speed railway (new line, 300 km/h)
 Nuremberg-Ingolstadt high-speed railway (new line, 300 km/h)
 Wendlingen–Ulm high-speed railway (new line, 250 km/h)

Lines not yet completed
 Karlsruhe–Basel high-speed railway (new line, 250 km/h, incomplete, sections under construction)
 Stuttgart–Wendlingen high-speed railway (new line, 250 km/h, under construction)
 Vogelfluglinie (partially new line, partially being upgraded)
 Lübeck–Hamburg railway (German part, to be upgraded to reach 200 km/h)
 Lübeck–Puttgarden railway (German part, to be electrified to reach 200 km/h up from the current 160 km/h, under construction)
 Fehmarn Belt Fixed Link (tunnel part, will replace the Rødby–Puttgarden ferry, 200 km/h, under construction, completion expected in 2028)
 Sydbanen (Danish part, new tracks to be laid by 2021, to be electrified to reach 200 km/h by 2024, under construction)
 Copenhagen–Ringsted Line (Danish part, opened on 31 May 2019, currently operating at 180 km/h, upgrading to 250 km/h in 2023)

Lines planned
 Frankfurt–Mannheim high-speed railway (new line, 300 km/h, in planning)
 Hanau-Gelnhausen high-speed railway (new line, 300 km/h, in planning)
 Hanover-Bielefeld high-speed railway (new line, 300 km/h, in planning)
 Bielefeld-Hamm high-speed railway (upgraded line, 300 km/h, in planning)
 Nuremberg-Würzburg high-speed railway (new line, 300 km/h, in planning)
 Hanover-Hamburg high-speed railway/Hanover-Bremen high-speed railway (Y-shaped, partially new line, 160 and 300 km/h on new sections, 160 km/h on a existing section, in planning)
 Ulm-Augsburg high-speed railway (new line, 250 km/h, in planning)
 Gelnhausen-Fulda high-speed rail  (new line, 250 km/h, in planning)

Travel times

References